Andrew-Lee Potts (born 29 October 1979) is an English actor and director. He is best known for his role as the quirky Connor Temple on ITV's British science fiction programme Primeval and Space's Canadian spinoff Primeval: New World. He also starred as the Hatter on the SyFy mini-series Alice and was a series regular on the long-running programme Ideal. Since 2006, Potts has written and directed short films through his production house, Keychain Productions. In 2008, he directed a documentary about the filming of Primeval called Through the Anomaly.

Early life
Potts was born and raised in Bradford, West Yorkshire. His parents are Alan and Susan Potts, and he has one sister, actress Sarah-Jane Potts, with whom he attended Bradford's Scala Kids stage school. He studied at Intake High School Arts College, in Leeds, which specializes in performing arts. Potts left school at 16 to pursue acting full-time.

Acting career

Early appearances
Potts started in drama classes at age seven and was cast pretty quickly in small shows that were based in Northern England. At ten years old, he made his first television appearance in Children's Ward. When he was 18, he landed a small role in HBO's Band of Brothers. He played Private Eugene Jackson, a character who is killed by a wound from his own grenade. Potts appeared steadily on television after that. In 2003, he appeared on two critically acclaimed programmes: twice on Buried and then the recurring role of Toby in six episodes of Strange. The same year, he appeared as Nero in the feature film Boudica. The following year, he was cast as Jonathan Chadwick for two episodes of Fat Friends. In 2006, Potts played a killer in a two-episode arc of Trial & Retribution. He had a role in the American movie Caffeine playing the ex-boyfriend of Katherine Heigl, an experience playing a stoner in comedy role that filmed prior to Ideal.

Ideal
Beginning in 2005, Potts joined the cast of the sitcom Ideal as drugged-out Lee, front man of the synth-pop band Silicone Valets with a serious messiah complex. The show, which starred Johnny Vegas as a small-time dope dealer, was a cult favourite and ran for over 50 episodes and 7 series.

Primeval
In 2007, Potts originated the role of Connor Temple in the science fiction programme, Primeval. Although critically panned as campy on its debut, it became a hit show and pop cultural phenomenon. The storyline saw a team of scientists battling prehistoric and future beasts falling into the present through anomalies in time. Potts played geeky antihero Connor Temple, the vulnerable and innocent student of lead Nick Cutter (Douglas Henshall). "Connor just came really easy to me. It was something organic that I discovered quite naturally with the character and everyone on Primeval allowed me to run with that." During the course of programme, Potts became romantically coupled with co-star Hannah Spearritt both on-screen and off-screen, which garnered media attention for both the couple and the show.

Primeval relied heavily on special effects which made it a costly show to produce. It was cancelled due to financial considerations after its third season, despite very high ratings. Following a public appeal, the production company Impossible Pictures partnered with ITV and their corporate competitor, UKTV, to finance a renewal.

The show returned with five webisodes in late 2010. Series four and five followed, featuring Potts and Spearritt and co-star Ben Miller with additional new cast members including Ben Mansfield and Ciarán McMenamin. During the break in filming, Potts and Spearritt underwent a physical transformation to conform with the plotline of the programme, which had matured their characters. "I'd played Connor for a few years and in a way he was always kind of the underdog and told what to do. In series four and five, though, he stepped up a bit and wanted to show and prove what he could do and what Cutter believed was in him from the start...I'm very grateful for what the writers gave me to do and I just hope that I did the material justice."

In 2012, Potts reprised the character of Connor in the Canadian spinoff, Primeval: New World as an "organic link between the original mythology and the new series universe". He appeared in 2 of the series' 13 episodes (first and last) which were filmed in Vancouver. The reboot starred Niall Matter as Evan Cross with Crystal Lowe as Toby Nance, the character corollary to Potts' Connor in the original. Despite the popularity of the original in North America, the new programme was cancelled after its initial run. In the finale several plot points were wrapped up, including an allusion that Connor and on-screen partner Abby Maitland married. Pott's acting in this episode was especially well received; "Andrew Lee Potts as Connor continues to light up this episode with a great mix of humour and pathos and really makes the piece."

Alice
In 2009, Potts played the role of Hatter in the SyFy television miniseries Alice. Nick Willing wrote and directed the re-imagining of the Alice in Wonderland as a fantasy adventure. "Andrew Lee Potts does a fair job as the Hatter, who acts as Alice's guide through the craziness of Wonderland." The cast featured Caterina Scorsone in the title role, with Kathy Bates, Colm Meaney, and Matt Frewer. The programme received mixed reviews but Pott's acting in the roguish romantic role was considered a bright spot; "The true standouts here are Potts and Frewer, both of whom are exceptionally funny and charismatic." Despite the tepid critical response, Alice was a popular hit with high ratings and a 72% "fresh" rating at Rotten Tomatoes.

2010-present
In 2009, Potts guest starred on an episode of Inspector George Gently as mixed-race young adult who is the chief suspect in his girlfriend's murder. In 2010, Potts appeared in the television adaptation of Kay Mellor's A Passionate Woman as the lead's (Billie Piper) adult son, Mark. In October 2011 he was featured in an episode of Doc Martin as Michael Dunwich; Born with a Shotgun.

Potts starred in the SyFy original movie True Bloodthirst (called Vampyre Nation or Vampire Nation in some markets) which was a "bloody, violent, traditional vampire movie". Pott's character was a descendant of Jonathan Harker, one of the protagonists of Bram Stoker's original Dracula story. It was broadcast in the summer of 2012.

In October 2012 Potts appeared onstage in Dracula with Max Wrottesley and Charlie Bond at the Leicester Square Theatre. Directed by Adam Morley, the drama was part of seasonal horror festival.

In 2013, Potts was cast in the BBC crime procedural By Any Means. The programme, which features Warren Brown, is a 6-parter about a team of elite cops.

In 2018, Andrew completed filimg for the role of Barnes on short film Chimera, directed by award winner Patrick Ryder.

In 2019, Andrew was cast to play astronaut Michael Collins in the Netflix series The Crown.

Directing
In 2006, Potts created Keychain Productions with Alex Moss and Tony Denman. The low-budget production house has released a variety of shorts, including; Blood on Benefits, Idance! and Colour Blind . Two of his films have been nominated for Virgin Media Short Film Awards: Little Larry in 2012 and Atwood Alley in 2013.

In 2008, Potts spent 5 months directing a behind-the-scenes documentary, Through the Anomaly, for Primeval. Potts found the direction of a documentary to be a new challenge; "I started directing. It's something that I want to do. I started directing short films. The producers saw the short films - and the "making of" the year before was quite dry - and came to me, which was funny because I was asking the same question. So they gave me a camera and off I went and never stopped filming, trying to capture as many moments as I could." Produced by Potts and Ross, the documentary was broadcast before being released as part of the Primeval series DVD.

Personal life
Potts met Hannah Spearritt in 1997 and they dated briefly. In 2006, they were both cast in Primeval, later they rekindled their relationship. Potts proposed while they were on a holiday in Mallorca in 2008. The couple owned a home in London, where they lived with their dog, Stanley. However, the relationship ended in early 2013, as confirmed by Potts. In addition to Primeval, the couple collaborated in several Keychain Productions shorts and appeared together at 2013's Midlands Comic Con. On 20 August 2014, Potts married singer Mariama Goodman. He has one step-daughter born to Mariama in 2011. The couple have a son Grayson, born on 17 August 2016.

Filmography

References

External links

Keychain Productions

Male actors from Bradford
English male stage actors
English male television actors
1979 births
Living people